Lucas Woudenberg (born 25 April 1994) is a Dutch professional footballer who plays as a left-back for Eerste Divisie club Willem II.

Career
Woudenberg joined Willem II on 27 June 2022, signing a three-year contract.

Career statistics

Honours
Feyenoord
 Eredivisie: 2016–17

References

External links
 
 Voetbal International profile 
 

Living people
1994 births
People from Woerden
Association football defenders
Dutch footballers
Netherlands youth international footballers
Netherlands under-21 international footballers
Feyenoord players
Excelsior Rotterdam players
NEC Nijmegen players
SC Heerenveen players
Willem II (football club) players 
Eredivisie players
Eerste Divisie players
Footballers from Utrecht (province)